Muamer Avdić (born 7 January 1993 in Mostar) is a Bosnian-Herzegovinian football player who currently plays for Start Brno.

Club career
He played several seasons for Czech side 1. SC Znojmo.

References

External links

1993 births
Living people
Sportspeople from Mostar
Association football defenders
Bosnia and Herzegovina footballers
Bosnia and Herzegovina under-21 international footballers
1. SC Znojmo players
FC Zbrojovka Brno players
FK Baník Most players
FK Fotbal Třinec players
Czech First League players
Czech National Football League players
Bosnia and Herzegovina expatriate footballers
Expatriate footballers in the Czech Republic
Bosnia and Herzegovina expatriate sportspeople in the Czech Republic
Bosnia and Herzegovina youth international footballers